Beijing Office for Criminal Deportation is a prison in the municipality of Beijing, China. On average detains 2,000 prisoners each year and repatriates 8,000. Charged with the task of detaining and repatriating prisoners who commit crimes in Beijing and are sentenced to death with reprieves, life in prison, or fixed prison sentence.

See also
List of prisons in Beijing municipality

References

Laogai Research Foundation Handbook

Prisons in Beijing